Pyrausta microdontaloides is a moth in the family Crambidae. It was described by Koen V. N. Maes in 2009. It is found in Kenya and Tanzania.

References

Moths described in 2009
microdontaloides
Moths of Africa